Chamidae, common name the jewel boxes or jewel box clams, is a taxonomic family of saltwater clams, a group of marine bivalve mollusks in the order Venerida.

Genera and species
Genera and species in the family Chamidae:
Arcinella Schumacher, 1817
Arcinella arcinella (Linnaeus, 1767) – spiny jewelbox
Arcinella cornuta Conrad, 1866 – Florida spiny jewelbox
Chama Linnaeus, 1758
Chama arcana Bernard, 1976 – secret jewelbox
Chama congregata Conrad, 1833 – corrugate jewelbox
Chama echinata Broderip, 1835
Chama florida Lamarck, 1819 – pretty jewelbox
Chama frondosa Broderip, 1835
Chama hicksi Valentich-Scott & Coan, 2010
Chama lactuca Dall, 1886 – milky jewelbox
Chama macerophylla Gmelin, 1791 – leafy jewelbox
Chama pellucida Broderip, 1835
Chama sarda Reeve, 1847 – cherry jewelbox
Chama sinuosa Broderip, 1835 – smooth-edge jewelbox
Chama sordida Broderip, 1835
Chama venosa Reeve, 1837
Pseudochama Odhner, 1917
Pseudochama exogyra (Conrad, 1837) – Pacific jewelbox
Pseudochama granti Strong, 1934 – deep jewelbox
Pseudochama inezae Bayer, 1943 – alabaster jewelbox
Pseudochama radians (Lamarck, 1819) – Atlantic jewelbox

References

 
Bivalve families